Alopecosa aculeata is a species of wolf spider in the family Lycosidae. It is found in North America, Europe, Turkey, Caucasus, a range from Russia (European to Far East), Central Asia, China, and Japan.

References

External links

 

aculeata
Articles created by Qbugbot
Spiders described in 1757
Taxa named by Carl Alexander Clerck